Benjamin Bentley Blackburn  (born February 14, 1927) is a former U.S. Representative from Georgia who served from 1967 to 1975.

Life and career
Born in Atlanta, Blackburn attended public school there and graduated in 1947 from the University of North Carolina at Chapel Hill, North Carolina, and in 1954 from the Emory University School of Law in Atlanta. During World War II, Blackburn served in the United States Navy from 1944 to 1946 and again during the Korean War from 1950 to 1952.  He was retired as a lieutenant commander in the United States Naval Reserve. He served in the State attorney general's office from 1955 to 1957. He was admitted to the bar in 1954 and commenced private practice in Atlanta after service with the attorney general.

In 1966, Blackburn was elected as a Republican to the Ninetieth Congress, having narrowly defeated freshman incumbent James MacKay by 360 votes: 55,249 (50.2 percent) to 54,889 (49.8 percent). In that same election fellow Republican Bo Callaway challenged the Democrat Lester Maddox, a strong segregationist from Atlanta, in the 1966 gubernatorial race. Though Callaway led Maddox by some three thousand votes, he did not have the required majority; under the Georgia Constitution, the state legislature broke the impasse by electing Maddox. Blackburn supported Callaway, who as a congressman had sought to curb the high costs of federal social programs. Years later, Blackburn described Maddox as a "far better governor than his critics will ever admit." Then out of office himself, Blackburn noted that no claim of corruption arose against Maddox, whose administration was characterized by economic development and the appointment of African Americans to state executive positions. Blackburn was reelected to Congress in the three succeeding terms but was unsuccessful in a campaign for reelection in 1974.

In 1975 President Gerald Ford nominated him to serve as a member of the Federal Home Loan Bank Board. On November 12, his nomination was rejected by the Senate Banking Committee in an 8–5 vote. Blackburn served as president of the Southeastern Legal Foundation from 1976 until 1985. In 1982, he ran for governor of Georgia, but was defeated in the Republican primary by State Senator Bob Bell, 36,347 (59.2 percent) to 25,063 (40.8 percent). Bell then lost in the general election to the Democrat Joe Frank Harris.

References

 Retrieved on 2009-5-13

1927 births
Living people
Emory University School of Law alumni
University of North Carolina at Chapel Hill alumni
Georgia (U.S. state) lawyers
United States Navy personnel of World War II
United States Navy personnel of the Korean War
United States Navy officers
Republican Party members of the United States House of Representatives from Georgia (U.S. state)
People from Jasper, Georgia
Military personnel from Georgia (U.S. state)